Windjammer is a 1930 British adventure film directed by John Orton and starring Michael Hogan and Tony Bruce. Stuart Legg and Arthur B. Woods were assistant directors. It is based on the book By Way of Cape Horn by A.J. Villiers

Premise
A full-rigged windjammer ship sails from Australia to England via Cape Horn.

Cast
 Michael Hogan - Bert
 Tony Bruce -  Jack
 Hal Gordon - Alf
 Roy Travers - Old Ned

References

External links
 

1930 films
British black-and-white films
British adventure films
1930 adventure films
1930s English-language films
1930s British films
English-language adventure films